The National Bank of Oman Golf Classic was a golf tournament on the Challenge Tour. It was played for the first time in October 2013 at Al Mouj Golf, The Wave in Muscat, Oman. In 2015, the tournament was superseded by the Challenge Tour Grand Final when that tournament relocated to Al Mouj.

Winners

See also
 Oman Open

References

External links
Coverage on the Challenge Tour's official site

Former Challenge Tour events
Golf in Oman
Recurring sporting events established in 2013
Recurring sporting events disestablished in 2014
2013 establishments in Oman
2014 disestablishments in Oman